Agathodes modicalis is a moth in the family Crambidae. It was described by Achille Guenée in 1854. It is found in India, Indonesia (Java, Sumatra) and in South Africa (KwaZulu-Natal).

References

Moths described in 1854
Spilomelinae
Moths of Africa
Moths of Asia